Ivar Halfdansson or Ivarr Upplendingajarl ("Ivar the Oppland Earl") was a possibly mythical king of Oppland, a petty kingdom in Norway. If he existed, Ivar probably lived during the late 8th century.

Traditional sources state that he was father of Eystein Glumra and, according to the Orkneyinga Saga, an ancestor of both the Earls of Orkney and  Rollo of Normandy.

References

Norwegian petty kings
History of Oppland
8th-century monarchs in Europe